Slaviša Pavlović (born February 5, 1982 in Ljubovija) is Serbian writer, poet and journalist.

Early life
Pavlovic grew up in Crnča, small village  located in the Mačva District of western Serbia.

Career
He has published novels Testament (2010), There’s no way to fail (2012), Testament heroes (2014), a collection of poetry, Dawn of Eternity (2014), Apostle Colonel Apis (2016), Warriors of a Black Hand (2017), Himerina krv:roman o Ducicu (2020).
His novel Testament heroes was published in Russian on the occasion of the centenary of the First World War in the Russian Federation. Preface to this edition was written by Sergey Naryshkin, chairman of the State Duma of Russia and Emir Kusturica, Serbian director.
In 2016. he has published thriller novel Apostle Colonel Apis.  That is story about an alternative version of Serbian History. In the novel, a secret military society called Black Hand, which had something to do with the May Coup (assassination of the Serbian King and his wife in May 1903), continues to exist through now, in the United States.
In 2020. he has published biography novel Himerina krv: roman o Dučiću, story about Jovan Dučić), one of the most influential Serbian lyricists and modernist poets.

Scripts

He wrote the script for the popular Serbian sitcom Felix.

Also, he wrote script for the popular Serbian drama U klinču.

Other works

At the invitation of the Russian Historical Society and the Association ”Franco-Russian dialogue” has participated in several international scientific and historical events dedicated to the First World War.

He was the editor in chief of ReStart magazine in Serbia, and the executive editor of Sofia Magazine in Serbia.
Is a regular columnist sheets Serbian voice from Australia and monthly Guide to life in Belgrade.

He lives in Belgrade.

Bibliography
 Zavet (Testament, a novel) (Književna omladina Srbije, 2010)
 Nema šanse da ne uspem (There´s no way to fail, a novel) (Smart studio, 2012)
 Osvit večnosti (Dawn of Eternity, a collection of poetry) (Smart studio, 2014)
 Zavet heroja (Testament heroes, a novel) (Laguna, 2014)
 Apisov apostol (Apostle Colonel Apis, a novel) (Laguna, 2016)
 Ratnici Crne ruke (Warriors of a Black Hand) (Radio Television Serbia and Prometej, 2017)
 Himerina krv: roman o Dučiću (Chimera blood: a novel about Dučić) (Laguna, 2020)

Writing credits

References

External links
 
 Russian edition of Testament heroes
 Official web page on russian, serbian and english 
 Radio Television Serbia: Roman Testament heroes hit in Russia 
 Laguna publisher about Testament heroes
 Slaviša Pavlović's homepage

Living people
Serbian novelists
Writers from Belgrade
1982 births
21st-century Serbian poets
Serbian male poets
21st-century male writers